Nayong County is a county in the west of Guizhou province, China. It is under the administration of Bijie city. It is rich in natural resources: coal, lead, zinc, marble, sulfur, iron, fluorite, dolomite, limestone and others. A significant portion of Guizhou's coal production is extracted in Nayong. For agriculture, timber, tobacco, walnut and tea are some products of importance.

Administrative divisions
Nayong is partitioned in the following town-level divisions:

Climate

Demographics
The total population is a little over 1 million people as of 2016 with a male to female ratio of 1.07:1. The urban population was 242,379 people. Nayong is home to at least 29 ethnic minorities such as Miao, Yi, Bai, Buyi, Hui, Dong and Zhuang.

Transportation
 G76 Xiamen–Chengdu Expressway
 G56 Hangzhou–Ruili Expressway

Nayong has a railway station on the Zhijin to Liupanshui railroad, which was completed in 2015.

References

County-level divisions of Guizhou
Bijie